Cajamarca Quechua is a variety of Quechua spoken in the districts of Chetilla, Baños del Inca and Cajamarca (Porcón) in the Peruvian province of Cajamarca, along the northwest coast of Peru.

It was never spoken throughout the region, where other indigenous languages like Kulyi, Jivaroan, or Mochica were spoken .

Cajamarca Quechua is severely endangered, as hardly any children are now learning it.

Cajamarca Quechua belongs to Quechua II, subgroup Cajamarca–Cañaris (Quechua II a, Yunkay) and is closest to Lambayeque Quechua, with which it has 94% lexical similarity. Félix Quesada published the first grammar and dictionary in 1976.

Phonology 
There are three vowels: /a, i, u/

References

Bibliography
Félix Quesada C. (1976): Diccionario Quechua de Cajamarca–Cañaris [–Castellano y vice versa]. Ministerio de educación del Perú.
Félix Quesada C. (1976): Gramática quechua, Cajamarca-Cañaris. Ministerio de educación del Perú.
David Coombs et al. (2003): Rimashun kichwapi: Hablemos en quechua
Marco A. Arana Zegarra (2002): Resolución de Conflictos Medioambientales en la Microcuenca del Río Porcón, Cajamarca 1993-2002. Thesis 2002, Pontífica Universidad Católica del Perú.
Ronel Groenewald et al. (2002): Shumaq liyinawan yaĉakushun - Aprendamos con los cuentos bonitos

External links

David Coombs et al. (2003): Rimashun Kichwapi: hablemos en quechua (introduction to Cajamarca Quechua, in Spanish)
Pulla purishun: Academia Regional del Idioma kichwa variedad Cajamarca, ARIQC (German web server)
Mushuq Tistamintu: The New Testament in Cajamarca Quechua (PDF 2.2 MB)
Mishki Rimay (Dulce Idioma): Dolores Ayay Chilón on Quechua and indigenous culture in the community of Porcón (in Quechua, Spanish subtitles)

Stories in Cajamarca Quechua 
 Unay willanakuna: Urqu Kilish (The Apu Quilish and other tales, collected by Dolores Ayay Chilón, ARIQC)
 Cuentokuna llaqtancheqmanta (1979, told by Blanca Ortiz Chamán, Cruz Landa Quito, Vicente Ortiz Alaya, collected by David Coombs, SIL, PDF 1.0 MB)
 Shumaq Kwintukuna (1983, told by Cruz Landa Quito, Vicente Ortiz Alaya, SIL, PDF 1.4 MB)
 Unay Kwintitukuna (1997, collected by Santos A. Calua Terán, SIL, PDF 2.4 MB)

Languages of Peru
Quechuan languages